The 2008–09 New Zealand V8 season began at Taupo on 3–5 October 2008 and finished at Hamilton near Auckland on 17–19 April 2009 after seven championship meetings and one season-ending non-championship event. Kayne Scott overturned a 38-point deficit heading into the final round at Pukekohe Park Raceway, to finish as champion; winning the title by nine points ahead of John McIntyre.

Teams and drivers
The following teams and drivers are competing in the current series.

Points structure
Each championship round consists of three races, one on Saturday afternoon, one on Sunday morning and a final reverse grid race on Sunday afternoon. Points for the 2008/2009 championship are allocated as follows:

Calendar

 The non-championship round was held in support to V8 Supercars at the Hamilton 400.

Points table

References

NZ Touring Cars Championship seasons
V8 season
V8 season